Theo Hobson (born 1972) is a British theologian. He was educated at St Paul's School in London; he read English literature at the University of York, then theology at the University of Cambridge, where he was a member of Hughes Hall. He focused on the strongest voices of the Protestant tradition: Martin Luther, Søren Kierkegaard, and Karl Barth. His PhD thesis became the basis of his first book, The Rhetorical Word: Protestant Theology and the Rhetoric of Authority (2002), a study of the role of authoritative rhetoric in Protestantism.

He gradually turned his attention to ecclesiology. His next book was Against Establishment: An Anglican Polemic (2003). In this book he announced that the Church of England was doomed, and that he considered himself a "post-Anglican". His third book is Anarchy, Church and Utopia: Rowan Williams on the Church (2005), a critique of the archbishop's ecclesiology and perhaps of all ecclesiology. He has written for various journals and newspapers including The Guardian, The Times, The Spectator, and The Tablet.

His principal interests are the relationship between Protestantism and secularism, which he believes is more positive than is generally understood; the relationship between theology and literature; and the post-ecclesial renewal of worship. He thinks that large-scale carnival-style celebration must replace church worship. He lives in Harlesden, London, and is married with two children.

Hobson has argued that although there is an instinctive mistrust of spectacle in the Protestant church, Catholic-style theatricality is an essential part of religion. 

In his 2013 book Reinventing Liberal Christianity it is proposed that it is possible to be a political and secular liberal that avoids the truth claims of Christianity while retaining the cultus.

Published works

See also
 Rowan Williams

References

External links
 
 The Guardian articles

1972 births
Alumni of Hughes Hall, Cambridge
Alumni of the University of York
British Christian theologians
Ecclesiologists
Living people
People from Harlesden
The Guardian journalists
People educated at St Paul's School, London